The following is a list of all team-to-team transactions that have occurred in the National Hockey League during the 2010–11 NHL season. It lists what team each player has been traded to, signed by, or claimed by, and for which player(s) or draft pick(s), if applicable. Players who have retired are also listed. The trade deadline for the 2010–11 NHL season occurred on February 28, 2011, at 3 pm EST.

Retirement

Free agency
Note: This does not include players who have re-signed with their previous team as an unrestricted free agent or as a restricted free agent.

Trades between teams

June

July

August/September

October

November

December

January

February

March

May/June

See also
2010–11 NHL season
2010 NHL Entry Draft
2011 NHL Entry Draft
2010 in sports
2011 in sports
2009–10 NHL transactions
2011–12 NHL transactions

References

TSN transactions
Official NHL Free Agent signings
The Hockey News transactions

Transactions
National Hockey League transactions